Càrn Dearg (941 m) is a remote mountain in Corrour Forest in the Grampian Mountains of Scotland. It lies northeast of Rannoch Moor, overlooking Loch Ossian, on the border of Highland and Perthshire.

The peak is usually reached via either Corrour station or Rannoch station as it is located miles away from any road or settlement.

References

Mountains and hills of Highland (council area)
Mountains and hills of Perth and Kinross
Marilyns of Scotland
Munros